The 860s decade ran from January 1, 860, to December 31, 869.

Significant people
 Rurik
 Al-Muntasir
 Al-Mu'tazz
 Al-Mu'ayyad
 Al-Muhtadi
 Pope Nicholas I
 Al-Musta'in
 Louis II, Holy Roman Emperor
 Ragnar Lodbrok
 Basil I
 Charles the Bald
 Louis the German
 Baldwin I of Flanders

References

Sources